Sequoia Charter School is a charter school in Mesa, Arizona. The Mesa campus is also home to Sequoia Deaf School. Both schools are operated by EdKey, which also operates 15 other charter schools throughout Arizona. The administration for the schools is located in Building 6 at the Horne Street campus.

Campus and administration
The campus contains eleven school buildings. Buildings 1-6 contain the secondary classrooms (as well as the administration offices), building 8 houses Sequoia Deaf School, and buildings 9-11 are home to the elementary classrooms. The School for the Deaf has students from K-12. Currently, the Principal of Sequoia Elementary is Altreana Anderson, the principal of Sequoia Secondary is Jevon Lewis. The school is accredited by AdvancED.

Staff
The Secondary staff are currently not up to date., as of July 2016, The Elementary staff are currently not up to date.

References

Public high schools in Arizona
Educational institutions established in 1996
Schools in Maricopa County, Arizona
1996 establishments in Arizona